Andrés Carretero Pérez (born 1955, Madrid), Spanish historian, Doctor in Geography and History. Since 2010 he is heading the National Archaeological Museum of Spain.

Biography 
Carretero Pérez graduated from Complutense University of Madrid. He has been director/deputy director of numerous museums in Spain. 1984-2001 he was the deputy director of the Spanish Village Museum, 1991-1994 he headed the State Museums under the Ministry of culture, 1994-2002 he was appointed as Deputy director of the Museo Nacional de Antropología, 2004-2008 director of Museo del Traje. Since 2010 he is the director of the National Archaeological Museum of Spain.

Works
Alfarería popular de Tajueco amb Matilde Fernández Montes i María Dolores Albertos Solera. Ministerio de Cultura, 1981. 
Estudio etnográfico de la alfarería conquense María Dolores Albertos Solera, Matilde Fernández Montes i Aurelio Lorente.Cuenca : Excelentísima Diputación Provincial, D.L. 1978.

Articles 
Renovarse y mantener las esencias: el nuevo Museo Arqueológico Nacional amb Carmen Marcos Alonso. Boletín del Museo Arqueológico Nacional, ISSN 0212-5544, Nº 32, 2014
El nuevo Museo Arqueológico Nacional, a la búsqueda de nuevos públicos.Museos.es: Revista de la Subdirección General de Museos Estatales, ISSN 1698-1065, Nº. 9-10, 2013-2014
El Museo del Traje: breve presentación. Indumenta: Revista del Museo del Traje, ISSN 1888-4555, Nº. 0, 2007
El Museo del Traje: Centro de Investigación del Patrimonio Etnológico. RdM. Revista de Museología: Publicación científica al servicio de la comunidad museológica, ISSN 1134-0576, Nº. 29, 2004
 Colecciones a raudales. Anales del Museo Nacional de Antropología, ISSN 1135-1853, Nº 9, 2002
Domus y la gestión de las colecciones museísticas. Marq, arqueología y museos, ISSN 1885-3145, Nº. 0, 2005 (Ejemplar dedicado a: Museos, arqueología y nuevas tecnologías)
Anales del Museo del Pueblo Español y Anales del Museo Nacional de Antropología. Aproximación bibliométrica. Revista de dialectología y tradiciones populares, ISSN 0034-7981, Tomo 57, Cuaderno 1, 2002
El Proyecto de Normalización: Documental de Museos: reflexiones y perspectivas. PH: Boletín del Instituto Andaluz del Patrimonio Histórico, ISSN 1136-1867, Año nº 9, Nº 34, 2001
 La Museología, ¿una práctica o una disciplina científica?.Museo: Revista de la Asociación Profesional de Museólogos de España, ISSN 1136-601X, Nº. 1, 1996 (Ejemplar dedicado a: Formación y selección de profesionales de museos)
 Técnicas alfareras andaluzas amb Matilde Fernández Montes i  Carmen Ortiz García. Revista de dialectología y tradiciones populares, ISSN 0034-7981, Cuaderno 42, 1987

References

External links 
«Obra de Andrés Carretero Pérez» en Dialnet

Directors of museums in Spain
20th-century Spanish historians
Writers from Madrid
Living people
1955 births